Da Liang Zao (大良造), the highest rank of Qin's bureaucracy, had supreme political and military power (equivalent to Prime Minister). It's a title of nobility as well. Also known as Da Shang Zao (大上造). The function of Da Liang Zao was replaced by "Xiang Guo" after King Huiwen of Qin, left it as a name of nobility only. It was inherited by Han dynasty

Chinese nobility
Qin (state)